Feyrer is a surname. Notable people with the surname include:

 James Feyrer (born 1968), American economist
 Julia Feyrer (born 1982), Canadian artist, performer, and writer
 Sebastian Feyrer (born 1997), Austrian footballer

See also
 Ferrer (surname)